Octagon House is a 1937 serialized novel by Phoebe Atwood Taylor that was distributed by the Associated Press and appeared in multiple newspapers in the United States.

Plot 
Octagon House tells the story of a New England town so scandalized by the offensive mural installed in their new post office that they paint over it. The novel focuses on government incompetence in general; a large and luxurious post office is built in a Cape Cod town with only 800 year-round residents. The mural, painted on the ceiling by Jack Lorne, a local painter who had stolen the commission through cronyism from Peggy Boone, another local painter, is titled The History and Customs of Cape Cod. Asey Mayo, the protagonist, is called in to solve the murder of Lorne's wife Marina. Multiple local prominent citizens are "viciously caricatured" in the painting.

Reactions to the mural take center stage to the solving of the mystery, as the townspeople are aghast at what it depicts:

Eventually postal staff misplace a key to the building and the mural is painted over after hours.

Style 
The novel was one of a series of Asey Mayo Mysteries set in the fictional Cape Cod town of Quanomet; Karal calls the protagonist of the series a "plain-spoken rustic" and the villains various "suave tourists" outwitted by the common-sense hero. In Octagon House, Taylor uses Asey Mayo to comment on the vagaries of government-commissioned art.

Cultural references 
At the time the book was written, New Deal programs were funding murals in hundreds of post offices throughout the United States. Art historian Karal Ann Marling wrote:

In 1937, after the unveiling of Dangers of the Mail, a post office mural that attracted widespread objections, Washington's Evening Star immediately called the mural "Art at its Worst", said it had "shocked all who have seen it", accused "government doles" of "foster[ing]...radicalism in art", and accompanied its review with a recounting of the plot of Octagon House.

Popularity 
The novel was serialized and distributed by the Associated Press and had, according to art historian Karal Ann Marling, "enjoyed a vast circulation".

Reception 
The New York Times said "it is the author's keen sense of humor that is the main attraction".

See also
 Octagon house (eight-sided building fashionable in the 19th century)

References

Further reading 

 
 Haycraft, H., Murder for Pleasure (1941).
 
 
 Klein, K. G., ed., Great Women Mystery Writers: Classic to Contemporary (1994). 
 Waugh, C. R., ed., Murder and Mystery in Boston (1987).
 A Catalogue of Crime (1971). 
 Detecting Women (1994). 
 Encyclopedia Mysteriosa (1994). 
 Encyclopedia of Mystery and Detection (1976). 
 St. James Guide to Crime & Mystery Writers (1996). 
 Twentieth-Century Crime and Mystery Writers (1980).
 Barnard Alumnae Monthly (Oct. 1932, March 1936). 
 NYT (12 Jan. 1976). WP (17 Jan. 1976).

Novels set in the 20th century
1937 American novels
Novels set on Cape Cod and the Islands
American mystery novels